was a  after a late 7th century interruption in the sequence of nengō after Shuchō and before Keiun. This period spanned the years from March 701 through May 704.

History
The new era commenced on the 21st day of the 3rd month of 701.

Timeline

The system of Japanese era names was not the same as Imperial reign dates.

Events of the Taihō era
 701 (Taihō 1): Plans for sending a diplomatic mission to the Tang court was approved.
 702 (Taihō 2): The  or Taihōryō reorganizing the central government and completing many of the reforms begun by the Taika Reforms in 646.
This was called the "embassy of Taihō" because it was begun during this era.

Notes

References
 Asakawa, Kan'ichi. (1903).   The Early Institutional Life of Japan. Tokyo: Shueisha.  OCLC 4427686;  see online, multi-formatted, full-text book at openlibrary.org
 Brown, Delmer M. and Ichirō Ishida, eds. (1979).  Gukanshō: The Future and the Past. Berkeley: University of California Press. ;  OCLC 251325323
 Fogel, Joshua A. (2009). Articulating the Sinosphere: Sino-Japanese Relations in Space and Time. Cambridge: Harvard University Press.  ; 
 Ponsonby-Fane, Richard Arthur Brabazon. (1962). Sovereign and Subject. Kyoto: Ponsonby Memorial Society. 
 Titsingh, Isaac. (1834). Nihon Ōdai Ichiran; ou,  Annales des empereurs du Japon.  Paris: Royal Asiatic Society, Oriental Translation Fund of Great Britain and Ireland.  OCLC 5850691
 Varley, H. Paul. (1980).  Jinnō Shōtōki: A Chronicle of Gods and Sovereigns. New York: Columbia University Press. ;  OCLC 59145842

External links
 National Diet Library, "The Japanese Calendar" -- historical overview plus illustrative images from library's collection

Japanese eras
8th century in Japan
701 beginnings
704 endings